The Bren is a light machine gun.

Bren or BREN may also refer to:

Weapons
Bren Carrier or Universal Carrier, a family of light armoured tracked vehicles built by Vickers-Armstrong
CZ 805 BREN, a Czech assault rifle created in 2009

Places
Bren, Drôme, France, a commune
Breń, Lesser Poland Voivodeship, Poland
Breń, West Pomeranian Voivodeship, Poland, a village

School-related
Bren School of Environmental Science & Management, University of California, Santa Barbara
Donald Bren School of Information and Computer Sciences, also known as the Bren School, University of California, Irvine
Bren Events Center, a stadium on the campus of the University of California, Irvine
Bren Hall, a hall on the campus of University of California, Santa Barbara

People
Bren (surname)
nickname of Avraham Adan (1926–2012), Israeli major general
Bren Foster (born 1978), English-born Australian actor
Bren Simmers (born 1976), Canadian poet
Bren Spillane (born 1996), American baseball player

Fictional characters
Bren Cameron, main character of C. J. Cherryh's Foreigner series science fiction series
Brenda "Bren" Furlong, main character of the British sitcom dinnerladies
Bren, one of the protagonists of the American television series Monsuno

Other uses
BREN or Bulgarian Research and Education Network
BREN Tower, a guyed steel framework mast on the Nevada Test Site in Nevada, U.S.

See also
Bren Ten, a semi-automatic pistol
Brens, Ain, France, a commune
Brens, Tarn, France, a commune